Maximilian Bradley Fewtrell (born 29 July 1999) is a British former racing driver, and former member of the Renault Sport Academy and 2016 British F4 champion. He competed in the 2020 FIA Formula 3 Championship for Hitech Grand Prix alongside Kiwi Liam Lawson and Norwegian Dennis Hauger, having driven for ART Grand Prix in the 2019 season.

Career

Karting
Fewtrell was born in Birmingham. At a young age, he moved to Malaysia first, then Singapore for 9 years. He also has an older brother, Sam, and a younger brother, Theo. Max began karting in 2009 at the age of ten after watching the Singapore Grand Prix. Fewtrell karted in Singapore but competed mainly in Malaysia. He went on to take major karting titles in 2013 and 2014.

Lower Formula
In 2015, Fewtrell graduated to single-seaters, partaking in the MRF Challenge where he finished eleventh.

The following year, Fewtrell joined Carlin for a campaign in British F4. He took three victories and claimed the championship in the final race at Brands Hatch.

Formula Renault
In December 2016, Fewtrell was named as part of Tech 1 Racing's driver line-up for the 2017 seasons of Formula Renault 2.0. He won a race at the Red Bull Ring on his way to the rookies' title, and came sixth in the drivers' championship.

The following year, Fewtrell switched to reigning team champions R-ace GP. He achieved six poles and six wins, including a double victory across a two race weekend at Hockenheim, making him the first driver to do so since Nyck de Vries. Fewtrell claimed the championship title in the season finale after a season-long battle with fellow Renault junior Christian Lundgaard.

GP3 Series
After winning the 2018 Formula Renault Eurocup, Fewtrell partook in the post-season test with ART Grand Prix.

FIA Formula 3 Championship
In January 2019 Fewtrell joined the championship with ART Grand Prix, alongside Christian Lundgaard and David Beckmann.
 He finished on the podium twice, first in Austria and then again at the Hungaroring, both being second-place finishes. Fewtrell concluded his debut season in 10th place, after scoring 57 points.

Formula One
In February 2017, Fewtrell was named as part of the Renault Sport Academy's 2017 line-up.

Other Ventures
Fewtrell has gained over forty thousand followers on the streaming-platform Twitch, where he predominantly plays Call of Duty alongside fellow British racing drivers Lando Norris and Dan Ticktum. He took part in Norris' Twitch Rivals Charity Tournament.

He launched his own merchandise line called Fewtrell Fits in December 2020.

After appearing in some earlier content, on 13 June 2021 Fewtrell was announced as a new ambassador for Norris' YouTube group and esports outfit, Team Quadrant.

During the Goodwood Festival Of Speed in 2022, Fewtrell took part in 2 sessions of the hill climb with Veloce Racing's Extreme E car alongside three-time W Series champion Jamie Chadwick.

Racing record

Career summary

‡ Fewtrell was ineligible for points from the second round onwards.
* Season still in progress.

Complete F4 British Championship results 
(key) (Races in bold indicate pole position; races in italics indicate fastest lap)

Complete Formula Renault Eurocup results
(key) (Races in bold indicate pole position) (Races in italics indicate fastest lap)

Complete FIA Formula 3 Championship results
(key) (Races in bold indicate pole position; races in italics indicate points for the fastest lap of top ten finishers)

Complete Macau Grand Prix results

References

External links
 
 

1999 births
Living people
English racing drivers
MRF Challenge Formula 2000 Championship drivers
British F4 Championship drivers
Formula Renault Eurocup drivers
FIA Formula 3 Championship drivers
Formula Renault 2.0 NEC drivers
F3 Asian Championship drivers
Carlin racing drivers
ART Grand Prix drivers
Tech 1 Racing drivers
R-ace GP drivers
Hitech Grand Prix drivers